Sergio Emilio Hinestrosa López (born 17 October 1986) is a retired Spanish-born Equatoguinean footballer who played as a midfielder. He was a member of the Equatorial Guinea national team.

Early life
Hinestrosa has born in Valencia, Spain to an Equatoguinean father (from Corisco) and a Spanish mother. His uncle, Felipe Hinestrosa Ikaka, was an economist who held several positions in the regime of Teodoro Obiang and died under mysterious circumstances. The airport of Corisco is named in Felipe's honor.

Club career
Hinestrosa played for Carcaixent in the Preferente Valenciana and then he took a leap into the Tercera División (Group 6), where he played for Alicante B in the second half of the 2008–09 season. His other stints in Tercera División were with Burjassot and Mislata. The rest of his club career was entirely in the Preferente Valenciana.

International career
In October 2010, Hinestrosa received his first call for the Equatoguinean senior team and participated in a friendly lost against Botswana by 0–2 in Malabo on 12 October 2010. He played a second match, against Burkina Faso in 2011.

References

External links

1986 births
Living people
Citizens of Equatorial Guinea through descent
Equatoguinean footballers
Association football midfielders
Equatorial Guinea international footballers
Equatoguinean people of Spanish descent
Spanish footballers
Footballers from Valencia (city)
Divisiones Regionales de Fútbol players
Spanish sportspeople of Equatoguinean descent